David "Nana" Grant (1956–1994) was an Australian rugby league footballer originally from Dubbo, New South Wales. He played as a prop/back-rower in the 1970s and 1980s for a number of teams in the New South Wales Rugby Football League (NSWRFL) competition.

Grant originally came to Sydney from Forbes and made his debut for the South Sydney Rabbitohs in 1976. The following year he moved to play for the Eastern Suburbs Roosters for one season, becoming the club's 678th capped player, before moving to spend four years with the Balmain Tigers. Grant toured NZ with a Combined Sydney side that year, then moved to the newly promoted Canberra club in 1982. He was the Raiders's first captain in its inaugural season in the New South Wales Rugby League premiership. Grant knocked out a member of the crowd (Peter Armstrong) in Ballina in 1992 when he was playing for Kyogle; Armstrong had abused him from Yobbos Hill at Kingsford Smith Park.

Grant died of a heart attack in Kyogle in 1994.

References

 
 

1956 births
1994 deaths
Australian rugby league players
Balmain Tigers players
Canberra Raiders captains
Canberra Raiders players
Indigenous Australian rugby league players
Kyogle Turkeys players
Rugby league players from Dubbo
Rugby league props
Rugby league second-rows
South Sydney Rabbitohs players
Sydney Roosters players